Sir Alan Russell Frampton  (born 2 November 1929) is a New Zealand agricultural economist. He had a career as an academic at Massey University from 1968 to 1983, before working as a consultant. He was a member of the New Zealand Dairy Board from 1973 to 1993, and was chair of the Tatua Dairy Company from 1990 to 2003.

In 1990, Frampton was awarded the New Zealand 1990 Commemoration Medal. In the 2005 New Year Honours, Frampton was appointed a Distinguished Companion of the New Zealand Order of Merit, for services to agriculture. Following the restoration of titular honours by the New Zealand government in 2009, he accepted redesignation as a Knight Companion of the New Zealand Order of Merit.

Frampton was conferred with an honorary Doctor of Science degree by Massey University in 2002, and in 2010 he received a distinguished alumnus award from the same institution.

References

1929 births
Living people
People from Morrinsville
Massey University alumni
Cornell University alumni
Academic staff of the Massey University
Agricultural economists
New Zealand economists
Knights Companion of the New Zealand Order of Merit